Hiroshima Maple Reds is a women's handball team based in Hiroshima, Japan. It plays in the Japan Handball League.  The club was founded in 1994 and belonged to IZUMI, a supermarket company in Hiroshima. The club was dissolved in 2001, then reinstated as HIROSHIMA MAPLE REDS by the Hiroshima Women's Sports Club (NPO).

From 1994 to 2006, the club has won the championships of Japan Handball League and others for 24 times in Japan.  They won the 1st prize at the Second East Asian Handball Club Championship in 2005 in Suzhou, China. And the 3rd prize at the First in Seongnam, Korea and the 4th prize at the third in Kyoto, Japan.  They won the 2nd prize at the 12th Hiroshima International Handball Games in 2007.

In April 2019 they were rebranded as the Izumi Maple Reds and did not play the 2020 season due to coronavirus concerns.

Team

Current squad
Squad for the 2019-20 season.

Goalkeepers
 1  Taeko Takamori
 12  Minami Itano
 16  Yayoi Kanou
 22  Momoko Nakamura
Wings
RW
 17  Miki Mitsuhashi
LW
 3  Sae Ishikawa
 9  Mai Kadodani
 26  Kaede Yamane
Line players
 6  Mana Horikawa
 14  Rie Inai
 21  Maharu Kondo
 25  Mayuka Nakanishi

Back players
LB
 7  Yuko Kawarabata
 19  Arisa Kimura
 20  Misa Tabuchi
 27  Saya Muramatsu
CB
 5  Maaya Matsugi
 8  Miki Mita
 28  Natsuki Tomai

Former players
 O-Kyung Lim - Head Coach, CP
 Akane Aoto - Coach

 Aimi Kiyama - CP
 Miho Tsuboi -CP
 Emi Sakaguchi -CP
 Jin-Soon Kim - CP
 Sung-Ok Oh - CP
 Emiko Egashira - GK
 Tone Hashizume
 Emi Sugimoto
 Miho Iwamoto
 Yukari Asai

References

Japanese handball clubs
Handball clubs established in 2001
Maple Reds
2001 establishments in Japan